Culture House Eemhuis is a culture house in Amersfoort, Netherlands was designed by Michiel Riedijk in 2013. The building houses cultural organizations including: a library, institutes of education, a school for arts, and spaces for art exhibition.

History

In 2013 Michiel Riedijk of Neutelings Riedijk Architects was the architect for the Eemhuis. The builders were Euramax, Harry van Interieurbouw, IFS-SGT, and Q-railing: the building was completed in 2014.

In order to build the Eemhuis the municipality had to buy out a 30 lease from a tenant who had rights to the property. The construction also had a 5 million dollar cost overrun.

The front of the building has three cantilevered sections which hang over a plaza entrance. The structure houses a library, a school of the arts, and large exhibition spaces. On the first floor of the building there is a 5500 m library: considered one of the most beautiful of the 154 libraries in the Netherlands. Each of the cantilevered sections is used for different departments: music, arts and theatre. Community archives are found in the center of the building.

See also
Lindenberg Nijmegen Culture House
Hollandsche Schouwburg
Royal Theater Carré
Flint (theatre)

References

Further reading

External links
Opening of the Eemhuis

Public libraries in the Netherlands
Buildings and structures in Amersfoort
Archives in the Netherlands